Garner is an English surname. Notable people with the surname include:

 Abigail Garner (born 1975), American author and advocate
 Alan Garner (disambiguation), several people
 Alice Garner (born 1969), Australian actress, author, musician, teacher and historian
 Alfred Buckwalter Garner (1873–1930), American politician, Republican member of the U.S. House of Representatives from Pennsylvania
 Amanda Garner (born 1985), Australian ballroom dancer
 Andrea Garner (born 1979), American basketball player
 Andy Garner (born 1966), English footballer
 Anthony Garner (1927–2015), political organiser for the British Conservative Party
 Archibald Garner (1904–1969), American sculptor
 Arthur Garner (born 1851), British and Australian theatrical entrepreneur
 Ben Garner (born 1980), football coach
 Bill Garner (disambiguation), several people
 Blair Garner, American radio host
 Bob Garner (1934–1990), American football player
 Bryan A. Garner (born 1958), American usage guide author
 Carl Garner (1915–2014), American engineer
 Carley Garner (born 1977), American commodity market strategist and futures and options broker
 Charles Garner (footballer), English footballer
 Charlie Garner (born 1972), American football player
 Chloe Garner (born 1990), South African and American long driver
 Chris Garner (disambiguation), several people
 Christie Garner (born 1973), American volleyball player
 Cindy Garner (1926–2000), American actress and model
 Cole Garner (Robert Cole Garner; born 1984), American baseball player
 Connie Garner (born 1979), fitness competitor
 Craig Garner (born 1971), New Zealand cricketer 
 Darlene Garner, American minister, and LGBT activist
 Darren Garner (born 1971), English footballer
 David Garner (disambiguation), several people
 Denise Garner (born 1956), American politician, member of the Arkansas House of Representatives
 Doreen Garner (born 1986), American sculptor and performance artist
 Duncan Garner (born 1974), New Zealand radio and television host and journalist
 Dwight Garner (born 1965), American writer and journalist
 Dwight Garner (American football) (1964–2022), American football player
 Dylan Garner (born 1998), American stock car driver
 Eli Garner (born 1991), American soccer player
 Elvira Garner (1886–1956), American author and illustrator
 Eric Garner (1970–2014), American man who died upon arrest
 Elizabeth Garner, pen name of the Scottish-born author and politician Elma Napier (1892–1973)
 Eleazer Garner (1887–1937), Canadian real estate and insurance agent, lawyer, farmer and politician
 Erica Garner (1990–2017), American activist
 Erroll Garner (1923–1977), American jazz pianist and composer
 Françoise Garner (born 1933), French opera singer
 Frank Garner, American politician, Republican member of the Montana House of Representatives
 George Garner (1892–1971), American vocalist and choral director
 Gerard Garner, English football player
 Glyn Garner (born 1976), Welsh football player
 Grace Garner (born 1997), British racing cyclist
 Greg Garner (born 1980), English rugby union referee
 Gretchen Garner (1939–2017), American art historian, curator, writer, teacher and photographer
 Hal Garner (born 1962), American college football player
 Harold Garner (born 1954), American biophysicist
 Harry Garner (1891–1977), British expert on oriental ceramics
 Helen Garner (born 1942), Australian novelist
 Horace Garner (1923–1995), American baseball outfielder
 Hugh Garner (1913–1979), British-born Canadian novelist
 Irene Sandiford-Garner (born 1961), Barbadian politician, journalist, businesswoman and activist
 Jack Garner (footballer) (born 1872), Welsh international footballer
 Jack Garner (1926–2011), American actor, The Rockford Files
 James Garner (disambiguation), several people
 Jasmine Garner (born 1994), Australian football player
 Jay Garner (1929–2011), American actor
 Jay Garner (born 1938), United States Army general
 Jeff Garner (born 1978), American fashion designer and visual artist
 Jennifer Garner (born 1972), American actress
 Jill Garner, Australian architect
 Jimmy F. Garner (born 1969), American mayor
 Joe Garner (born 1988), English footballer
 Joe Garner (author), American radio executive and author
 Joel Garner (born 1952), West Indian cricketer
 Joel Garner (footballer) (born 1999), Australian football player
 John Garner (disambiguation), several people
 Joseph Garner (disambiguation), several people
 Julia Garner (born 1994), American actress
 Kathy Garner, American lawyer, and judge
 Keith Vincent Garner (born 1955), Australia minister
 Kelli Garner (born 1984), American actress
 Kimberley Garner (born 1990), English swimwear designer and actress
 Kristin Garner, American country music singer-songwriter
 Larry Garner (born 1952), American blues musician
 Leonard R. Garner Jr., American television director and actor
 Linton Garner (1915–2003), American jazz pianist
 Louis Garner (born 1994), English football player
 Loyal Garner (1946–2001), Hawaiian musician 
 Lucile Garner (1910–2013), Canada's first flight attendant, first woman to be employed by Trans-Canada Air Lines (Air Canada)
 Luke Garner (born 1995), Australian rugby player
 Mack Garner (1898–1936), American jockey, 1934 Kentucky Derby winner
 Manasseh Garner (born 1992), American football player
 Marcellite Garner (1910–1993), American artist and voice actress, first regular voice of Minnie Mouse
 Margaret Garner, United States fugitive slave
 Mariette Rheiner Garner (1869–1948), wife of John Nance Garner
 Mark Garner (born 1969), Australian track and field sprinter
 Martin Garner (disambiguation), several people
 Marty Garner (born 1967), American  wrestler
 Mary Field Garner (1836–1943), Mormon pioneer
 Mary Texas Hurt Garner (1928–1997), American politician, Secretary of State of Alabama (1955–1959)
 Michael Garner (born 1954), English theatre and television actor
 Nadine Garner (born 1970), Australian actress
 Nate Garner (born 1985), American football player
 Nelson Garner (born 1976), American football player
 Paul Garner (1909–2004), American actor
 Paul Garner (comedian) (born 1968/69), English comedian, writer, producer and director
 Peggy Ann Garner (1932–1984), American actress
 Perci Garner (born 1988), American baseball player
 Peter M. Garner (1809–1868), American abolitionist
 Phil Garner (born 1949), American baseball player and manager
 Phillip Garner (1946–2009), English cricketer
 Philippe Garner (born 1949), French photography auctioneer
 Pippa Garner (born 1942), American artist
 Rex Garner (1921–2015), British-born South African actor and director
 Richard Garner (born 1969), Canadian sports broadcaster, vice-president of programming at The Score Television Network
 Richard Lynch Garner (1848–1920), American primatologist
 Richie Garner, American basketball player
 Rob Garner (born 1958), Canadian ice hockey player
 Robert Garner (born 1960), British political scientist, animal rights scholar
 Robert Francis Garner (1920–2000), American Catholic bishop
 Robby Garner (born 1963), American natural language programmer
 Samuel Paul Garner (1910–1996), American accounting scholar
 Sarah Garner (born 1971), American Olympic rower
 Scott Garner (born 1989), English football player
 Sean R. Garner, American physicist
 Simon Garner (born 1959), English football player
 Stanton Garner, American historian
 Steve Garner, American bridge player
 Stuart Garner (born 1968), British businessman
 Taylor Garner (born 1994), Australian football player
 Thomas Garner (disambiguation), several people
 Todd Garner, American film producer
 Tom Garner (born 1961), American golfer
 Tyrone Garner (disambiguation), several people
 Wendell Garner (1921–2008), American cognitive psychologist
 William Garner (disambiguation), several people
 Wix Garner (1897–1978), American sports coach and college athletics administrator

English-language surnames